The Western Lands is a 1987 novel by William S. Burroughs. The final book of the trilogy that begins with Cities of the Red Night (1981) and continues with The Place of Dead Roads (1983), its title refers to the western bank of the Nile River, which in Egyptian mythology is the Land of the Dead.  Inspired by the Egyptian Book of the Dead, Burroughs explores the after-death state by means of dream scenarios, hallucinatory passages, talismanic magic, occultism, superstition, and his characteristic view of the nature of reality.

Summary

The prose shifts back and forth between Burroughs' characters and episodes clearly drawn from his own life. Autobiographical scenes include vignettes where Burroughs takes out evidence of amphetamine prescription bottles his mother gave him to sink with a large stone at the bottom of the Lake Worth Lagoon in Florida. The bottles were evidence his mother found in her grandson's, Burroughs' own son's, bedroom. While Burroughs is ankle deep in the water, his aged mother is stalling police investigators in her home. The novel also dives backwards into ancient history, giving the plot a perspective on death that attempts to transcend Christian theology. Burroughs acknowledges being inspired by Norman Mailer's Ancient Evenings, a 1983 novel about ancient Egypt set a thousand years before Christianity. Nevertheless, there are references to contemporary culture; for instance, Mick Jagger appears in some episodes.

Reception 

Despite the narrative challenge of the historical framework, the novel is often regarded as Burroughs' best late work and a gratifying culminating episode of the Cities trilogy. According to The Guardian, it is his best work after Naked Lunch (1959).  In his review for The New York Times, the novelist Jonathan Baumbach labels The Western Lands as "not an easy work to like" and "offers us a vision that is viscerally unpleasant and often repellent", yet he finds the work to be a success and holds the trilogy to be "a comic meditation on death".  Both Baumbach and Burroughs' biographer Ted Morgan emphasize that Burroughs, in the guise of various characters, is trying to "write his way out of death".

Recording

Bill Laswell's band Material collaborated with Burroughs to produce the 1989 album Seven Souls, wherein Burroughs recites passages exclusively from this book to musical accompaniment. The album was reissued in 1997 with three bonus remixes. In 1998, an additional unreleased six remixes (plus one previously released) were introduced on the album The Road To The Western Lands.

Notes

1987 American novels
Novels by William S. Burroughs
Viking Press books